Pomorie Municipality is located in the Burgas Province, Bulgaria. The main economic activities are tourism, wine industry and grape growing.

Climate 
The Pomorie Municipality experiences a mild climate, especially in the winters which see little precipitation.

Natural resources 
Black-sand beaches containing magnetic compounds can be visited near the town of Pomorie.

Several natural regions are located in the Pomorie Municipality.  These include the Pomoriysko Lake (Lake Pomorie), Chairite, Koriata and the Dobrovanski Gabi. Lake Pomorie is a natural hyper-saline lagoon north of the town of Pomorie. Parts of the lake have been turned into salt-pans.

Subdivision 
There are three sub-regions of the territory which include the Black Sea coast, the Tundzhanska undulating plain and the Eastern Stara Planina.

The center is the town of Pomorie. The settlements in the municipality include the following 14 villages and 2 towns (in bold):

Demographics

Religion 
According to the latest Bulgarian census of 2011, the religious composition, among those who answered the optional question on religious identification, was the following:

References

External links

 

Municipalities in Burgas Province